United Nations Security Council Resolution 125 was adopted on September 5, 1957. After examining the application of the Federation of Malaya (now Malaysia) for membership in the United Nations, the Council unanimously recommended to the General Assembly that the Federation of Malaya be admitted.

The resolution was adopted unanimously by all 11 members of the Council.

See also
List of United Nations Security Council Resolutions 101 to 200 (1953–1965)

References 
Text of the Resolution at undocs.org

External links
 

 0125
Foreign relations of Malaysia
 0125
 0125
Malaysian Independence
1957 in Malaya
September 1957 events